Arakiel (Greek: ‘Αραθάκ Κιμβρά), also spelled Arâkîba, Araqiel, Araqael, Araciel, Arqael, Sarquael, Arkiel or Arkas, is a fallen angel, the second mentioned of the 20 Watcher leaders of the 200 fallen angels in the Book of Enoch, who taught the "signs of the earth" (which suggests geomancy) to humans during the days of Jared. Arakiel is also called Aretztikapha (meaning "world of distortion" [the combination of eretz + kaphah]) in Chapter 69. His name is generally translated as "earth of God"; the combination of araq-earth (Babylonian in origin) and El-God. Michael Knibb lists him as a combination of two names “the land of the mighty one” or “the land is mighty”.

See also
Samyaza
List of angels in theology

References

Watchers (angels)